The 2022 ISA World SUP and Paddleboard Championship took place in San Juan, Puerto Rico, from October 28 to November 6, 2022. The event was the 2022 world championships in standup paddleboarding (SUP) and paddleboarding, and was organized by the International Surfing Association (ISA).

Medal summary

Medalists

Men

Women

Team

Medal table

See also

2022 ISA World Surfing Games

References

External links

International Surfing Association

ISA World SUP and Paddleboard Championship
ISA World SUP and Paddleboard Championship
ISA World SUP and Paddleboard Championship
ISA World SUP and Paddleboard Championship
ISA World SUP and Paddleboard Championship
Sports in San Juan, Puerto Rico
International sports competitions hosted by Puerto Rico